Khatijah Mohamad Yusoff is an academician and a virologist. Her research on the Newcastle Disease Virus (NDV), a poultry virus has gained acknowledgement locally and globally.

Personal
Khatijah was born in Penang in 1956.

References 

Malaysian virologists
Academic staff of the University of Putra Malaysia
1956 births
Living people
People from Penang
La Trobe University alumni